The 2013 Australian V8 Ute Racing Series was an Australian motor racing competition for modified V8 engined production utilities.	
It was sanctioned by the Confederation of Australian Motor Sport (CAMS) as a National Series with Australian V8 Ute Racing Pty Ltd appointed as the Category Manager.			
Promoted as the 2013 Auto One V8 Ute Racing Series protected by Armor All, it was the 13th annual Australian V8 Ute Racing Series.

The series was won by Ryal Harris
driving a Ford FG Falcon Ute.

Calendar
The series was contested over eight rounds.

Points system
Series points were awarded on the following basis for each qualifying session and each race in the series.			

			
The results for each round were determined by the number of points scored by each driver at that round.				
			
The driver gaining the highest points total over all rounds was declared the winner of the Series.

Series standings

References

V8 Ute Racing Series
V8 Ute Racing Series